Yoshihiro is a Japanese masculine given name, and less commonly, a surname. There are dozens of different ways to write the name in kanji.

Some examples of possible writings

義弘, "justice, vast"
義広, "justice, wide"
義寛, "justice, generosity"
吉弘, "good luck, vast"
吉広, "good luck, wide"
吉博, "good luck, doctor"
善弘, "virtuous, vast"
善大, "virtuous, big"
善博, "virtuous, doctor"
善裕, "virtuous, abundant"
芳弘, "virtuous/fragrant,vast"
芳広, "virtuous/fragrant, wide"
芳博, "virtuous/fragrant, doctor"
良弘, "good, vast"
良広, "good, wide"
良博, "good, doctor"
慶弘, "congratulate, vast"

The name can also be written in hiragana よしひろ or katakana ヨシヒロ.

Given name
Notable people with the given name Yoshihiro are listed below. Names are written below in Japanese (except for people for whom the kanji used to write their name are not known) with the family name first, followed by a space and the given name.

Daimyō and samurai
Note: people in this section have their names written with the surname first.
 Hachisuka Yoshihiro (蜂須賀 至央, 1737–1754), Japanese daimyō
 Matsumae Yoshihiro (松前 慶広, 1548–1616), Japanese samurai
 Ōuchi Yoshihiro (大内 義興, 1356–1399), daimyō
 Satomi Yoshihiro (里見 義弘, 1530–1578), samurai
 Shimazu Yoshihiro (島津 義弘, 1535–1619), seventeenth head of the Shimazu clan
 Yoshihiro Muneyuki (吉弘 統幸, 1563–1600), aka Yoshihiro Kahei (吉弘 嘉兵衛), samurai

Sports

Baseball
 Yoshihiro Doi (土肥 義弘, born 1976), Japanese baseball pitcher (Nippon Professional Baseball)
 Yoshihiro Ito (baseball) (伊藤 義弘, born 1982), Japanese baseball pitcher (Nippon Professional Baseball)
 Yoshihiro Maru (丸 佳浩, born 1989), Japanese baseball player (Nippon Professional Baseball)
 Yoshihiro Suzuki (鈴木 義広, born 1983) is a Japanese baseball pitcher (Nippon Professional Baseball)

Football
 Yoshihiro Nakano (中野 嘉大, born 1993), Japanese football player
 Yoshihiro Natsuka (名塚 善寛, born 1969), Japanese football player
 Yoshihiro Nishida (西田 吉洋, born 1973), Japanese football player
 Yoshihiro Shoji (庄司 悦大, born 1989), Japanese football player 
 Yoshihiro Uchimura (内村 圭宏, born 1985), Japanese football player

Professional wrestling
 Yoshihiro Asai (浅井 嘉浩, born 1966), Japanese professional wrestler
 Yoshihiro Momota (百田 義浩, 1946–2000), Japanese professional wrestler 
 Yoshihiro Tajiri (田尻 義博, born 1970), Japanese professional wrestler
 Yoshihiro Takayama (高山 善廣, 21st century), Japanese professional wrestler and mixed martial arts fighter

Other
 Yoshihiro Akiyama (秋山 成勲, born 1975), Japanese judoka
 , Japanese sprinter
 Yoshihiro Fujita (wrestler) (藤田 芳弘, born 1952), Japanese Greco-Roman wrestler
 Yoshihiro Fujita (fighter) (born 1969), Japanese mixed martial artist
 Yoshihiro Horigome (堀籠 佳宏, born 1981), Japanese sprinter
 Yoshihiro Ito (racing driver) (born 1977), Japanese racing driver
 Yoshihiro Hamaguchi (浜口 喜博, born 1926), Japanese freestyle swimmer
 Yoshihiro Kitazawa (北沢 欣浩, born 1962), Japanese speed skater
, Japanese ice hockey player
 Yoshihiro Murakami (村上 佳宏, born 1976), Japanese modern pentathlete
 Yoshihiro Nakao (中尾 芳広, born 1972) Japanese mixed martial artist
 Yoshihiro Okumura (奥村 幸大, born 1983), Japanese swimmer
, Japanese rower
, Japanese gymnast
 Yoshihiro Sato (佐藤 嘉洋, born 1981), Japanese professional kickboxer and martial artist
, Japanese handball player 
 Yoshihiro Tsumuraya (born 1964), Japanese cyclist
 Yoshihiro Yasumi (born 1949), Japanese water polo player

Politics
 Yoshihiro Katayama (片山 善博, born 1951),  Japanese politician, Minister of Internal Affairs and Communications (2010) 
 Yoshihiro Kawakami (川上 義博, born 1950), Japanese politician with the Democratic Party of Japan
 Yoshihiro Kawano (河野 義博, born 1977), Japanese politician with Kōmeitō
 Yoshihiro Murai (村井 嘉浩, born 1960), Japanese politician with the Liberal Democratic Party, governor of Miyagi Prefecture
 Yoshihiro Seki (関 芳弘, born 1965), Japanese politician with the Liberal Democratic Party
 Yoshihiro Tokugawa (徳川 義寛, 1906–1996), Japanese political figure

Visual arts
 Yoshihiro Fukagawa (深川 栄洋, born 1976), Japanese film director
 Yoshihiro Nakamura (中村 義洋, fl. 21st century), Japanese film director
 Yoshihiro Nishimura (西村 喜廣, born 1967), Japanese film director
 Yoshihiro Takahashi (高橋 義廣, fl. 21st century), Japanese manga artist
 Yoshihiro Tatsuki (立木 義浩, 1935–2015), Japanese photographer
 Yoshihiro Tatsumi (fl. 21st century), Japanese manga artist
 Yoshihiro Togashi (冨樫 義博, born 1966), Japanese manga artist

Other
 Yoshihiro Francis Fukuyama (born 1952), American philosopher, political economist, and author
 Yoshihiro Hattori (服部 剛丈, 1975–1992), Japanese exchange student who was killed in the United States
 Yoshihiro Inoue (井上嘉浩, 1969–2018), Japanese terrorist and Aum Shinrikyo member who was executed
 Yoshihiro Kawaoka (河岡 義裕, born 1955), Japanese virologist, professor at the University of Wisconsin-Madison and the University of Tokyo
 Yoshihiro Narisawa (成澤 由浩, born 1969), Japanese chef
 Yoshihiro Tsurumi (霍見 芳浩, born 1935), Japanese economist, professor of international business at Baruch College of the City University of New York
 Yoshihiro Yasuda (安田 好弘, born 1948), Japanese lawyer and anti-death penalty activist
 Yoshihiro Yonezawa (米澤 嘉博, 1953–2006), Japanese manga critic

Surname
 Mitsuyuki Yoshihiro (吉弘 充志, born 1985), Japanese football player

References

Japanese masculine given names